Figure skating was contested at the 2005 Winter Universiade. Skaters competed in the disciplines of men's singles, ladies' singles, pair skating, and ice dancing.

Results

Men

Ladies

Pairs

Ice dancing

External links
 2005 Winter Universiade results

2005
Winter Universiade
2005 Winter Universiade
Winter Universiade